Sahil Uppal is an Indian actor who primarily works in Hindi television. He made his acting debut with P.S. I Hate You where he played Kabeer. He is best known for his portrayal of Kunal Singh Chauhan in Ek Shringaar-Swabhiman.

Uppal is also known for playing Vedant Bansal in Shakti - Astitva Ke Ehsaas Ki and Omkar Shukla in Pinjara Khubsurti Ka.

Early life
Sahil Uppal was born on 8 August 1990 in Noida, India. He graduated from Deshbandhu College, Delhi.

Personal life
On 8 December 2022, he married his girlfriend, Aakriti Atreja in Jaipur.

Career

Debut and breakthrough (2014-2018)
Uppal made his acting debut in 2014 with P.S. I Hate You, where played Kabeer alongside Chandni Bhagwanani. He then appeared in Maharakshak Devi as Tiger in 2015. From 2015 to 2016 he played Aarav Seth in Pavitra Bandhan. He then portrayed Ajay Malhotra in the supernatural thriller Brahmarakshas — Jaag Utha Shaitan in 2016.

Uppal portrayed Kunal Singh Chauhan / Kunal Singhania opposite Sangeita Chauhan in Ek Shringaar-Swabhiman from 2016 to 2017. It was produced under the banner Rajshri Productions.

In 2018, he played Virat Chopra in Jeet Gayi Toh Piya Morey alongside Yesha Rughani. The same year, he was seen as the antagonist Angraj Vyas opposite Sheen Das in Piyaa Albela.

Further career and success (2018-present)
In 2019, he played Vedant Bansal in Shakti — Astitva Ke Ehsaas Ki alongside Rubina Dilaik. He was seen as Dilaik's obsessed lover. The same year the appeared in an episode of Laal Ishq with Urvashi Sharma. He also appeared in the music video 'Kyun' alongside Meenakshi Chaudhary.

Uppal portrayed Omkar "Omi" Sanyal in Pinjara Khubsurti Ka opposite Riya Sharma from 2020 to 2021. The show took a reincarnation leap in 2021, he then played Omkar Vashisht. The show ended in 2021.

Uppal will next appear in the film First Second Chance alongside Devoleena Bhattacharjee and Renuka Shahane. He will also appear alongside Antara Biswas in Hungama Play's web series Challava.

Other work
Uppal emerged as the 2nd runner-up of Pantaloons Fresh Face contest in 2012. He has been part of many TVC and print campaigns including Big Bazar, Tata and Kingfisher beer.

Filmography

Television

Films

Web series

Music videos

References

External links

1990 births
Living people
Male actors in Hindi television
People from Noida
21st-century Indian male actors
Indian male soap opera actors